The Intruders is a 1970 American Western film directed by William A. Graham and starring Don Murray, Anne Francis, Edmond O'Brien, and John Saxon. The movie was filmed in 1967  under the title Death Dance at Madelia.

Plot
Jesse James and Bob Younger's gangs take over a city. Tyrannized, the inhabitants can only rely on the local marshall. Except that the latter has lost his nerve and can no longer shoot the gun...

Cast
 Don Murray as Sam Garrison
 Anne Francis as Leora Garrison
 Edmond O'Brien as Colonel William Bodeen
 John Saxon as Billy Pye
 Gene Evans as Cole Younger
 Edward Andrews as Elton Dykstra
 Shelly Novack as Theron Pardo
 Harry Dean Stanton as Whit Dykstra (as Dean Stanton)
Stuart Margolin as Jesse James
 Zalman King as Bob Younger
 Phillip Alford as Harold Gilman
 Harrison Ford as Carl
 John Hoyt as Appleton
 Ken Swofford as Pomerantz
 Robert Donner as Roy Kirsh
 Edward Faulkner as Bill Riley
 James Gammon as Chaunce Dykstra
 Gavin MacLeod as The Warden

References

External links

1970 films
1970s English-language films
American Western (genre) films
Films directed by William Graham (director)
Films scored by Dave Grusin
1970 Western (genre) films
1970s American films